Andréa Geneviève Grottoli is a Canadian biologist who is Professor of Earth Sciences at the Ohio State University. She is a Fellow of the American Association for the Advancement of Science, and was named the 2021 American Geophysical Union Rachel Carson Lecturer. She is the President of the International Coral Reef Society.

Early life and education 
Grottoli was an undergraduate at McGill University. She was a graduate student at the University of Houston, where she studied reef coral skeletons with Gerard Wellington. During her graduate studies, she went on a field trip to Hawaii with Paul Jokiel, and became inspired to learn more about coral reefs. She moved to the University of California, Irvine, where she worked as a postdoctoral fellow with Ellen Druffel.

Research and career 
In 2001, Grottoli started her academic career at the University of Pennsylvania, where she was supported by a Institute for Citizens & Scholars Fellowship. She was appointed assistant professor at Ohio State University in 2005. She established the Stable Isotope Biogeochemistry Laboratory. Her research combines geochemistry and coral biology. She is particularly interested in what allows corals to become resistant to climate change. She was a speaker at a 2015 TEDx Ohio State University event, where she spoke about the connection between humans and corals.

In 2019, Grottoli launched the Coral Bleaching Research Coordination Network (CBRCN). In 2020, she was awarded a Fulbright Program Fellowship. She spent the year in the Sorbonne University Oceanographic Lab in Villefranche-sur-Mer where she studied corals of the Mediterranean, and how they are able to survive in stressful environments.

Awards and honours 
 2004 Geochemical Society F.W. Clarke Award
 2016 International Coral Reef Society Studies Mid-Career Award 
 2016 Elected Fellow of the International Coral Reef Society
 2017 Elected Fellow of the American Association for the Advancement of Science
 2018 American Geophysical Union Voyager Award
 2018 Elected President of the International Coral Reef Society
 2021 American Geophysical Union Rachel Carson Lecture
 2021 Ohio State University Arts and Sciences Distinguished Professor of Earth Sciences

Selected publications

Personal life 
Grottoli is married with one daughter.

References 

Living people
Ohio State University faculty
Canadian women biologists
McGill University alumni
University of Houston alumni
Year of birth missing (living people)
American Geophysical Union awards
21st-century Canadian biologists
21st-century Canadian women scientists